This is a list of notable individual politicians and political organizations who have publicly indicated support for Donald Trump in the 2020 United States presidential election.

Trump Federal Executive Officials

Alex Azar, U.S. Secretary of Health and Human Services (2018–2021) and United States Deputy Secretary of Health and Human Services (2005–2007)
David Bernhardt, U.S. Secretary of the Interior (2019–2021) and United States Deputy Secretary of the Interior (2017–2019)
Jovita Carranza, Administrator of the Small Business Administration (2020–2021) and Treasurer of the United States (2017–2020)
Ben Carson, Secretary of Housing and Urban Development (2017–2021)
Elaine Chao, U.S. Secretary of Transportation (2017–2021) and U.S. Secretary of Labor (2001–2009)
Edward Crawford, U.S. Ambassador to Ireland (2019–2021)
Louis DeJoy, U.S. Postmaster General (2020–present)
Betsy DeVos, U.S. Secretary of Education (2017–2021)
David Friedman, U.S. Ambassador to Israel (2017–2021)
Richard Grenell, special envoy for the Serbia and Kosovo Peace Negotiations (2019–2021)
Keith Kellogg, National Security Advisor to the Vice President of the United States (2018–2021)
Larry Kudlow, Director of the National Economic Council (2018–2021)
Jared Kushner, Senior Advisor to the President (2017–2021), Director of the Office of American Innovation (2017–2021) and son-in-law to Donald Trump
Kayleigh McEnany, White House Press Secretary (2020–2021)
Mark Meadows, White House Chief of Staff (2020–2021) and U.S .Representative for NC-13 (2013–2020)
Mick Mulvaney, United States Special Envoy for Northern Ireland (2020–2021), White House Chief of Staff (2019–2020), director of the Office of Management and Budget (2017–2019)
Peter Navarro, Director of the Office of Trade and Manufacturing Policy (2017–2021) and Director of the National Trade Council (2017)
Robert C. O'Brien, National Security Advisor (2019–2021) and Special Envoy for Hostage Affairs (2017–2018)
Sonny Perdue, U.S. Secretary of Agriculture (2017–2021)
Mike Pompeo, Secretary of State (2018–2021), Director of the Central Intelligence Agency (2017–2018)
Brooke Rollins, Director of the Domestic Policy Council (2020–2021)
Wilbur Ross, U.S. Secretary of Commerce (2017–2021)
Dan Scavino, White House Deputy Chief of Staff (2020–2021)
Ja'Ron Smith, Assistant to the President for domestic policy (2019–2021)
Ivanka Trump, Advisor to the President for women's issues policy (2017–2021) and daughter of Donald Trump
David Urban, Chair of the American Battle Monuments Commission (2018–2021)
Seema Verma, Administrator of the Centers for Medicare & Medicaid Services (2017–2021)
Robert Wilkie, U.S. Secretary of Veterans Affairs (2018–2021) and Under Secretary of Defense for Personnel and Readiness (2017–2018)

Former federal executive officials

Vice Presidents

Dan Quayle, 44th Vice President of the United States (1989–1993), U.S. Senator from Indiana (1981–1989), U.S. Representative from IN-04 (1977–1981)
Dick Cheney, 46th Vice President of the United States (2001–2009), 17th United States Secretary of Defense (1989–1993), U.S. Representative from WY-AL (1979–1989), White House Chief of Staff (1975–1977)

Cabinet-level officials 

James Baker, White House Chief of Staff (1981–1985, 1992–1993), U.S. Secretary of State (1989–1992), U.S. Secretary of the Treasury (1985–1988)
Nikki Haley, U.S. Ambassador to the United Nations (2017–2018), Governor of South Carolina (2011–2017)
Linda McMahon, former president and CEO of World Wrestling Entertainment, 25th Administrator of the Small Business Administration (2017–2019)
Edwin Meese, U.S. Attorney General (1985–1988), Counselor to the President (1981–1985)
Jim Nicholson, U.S. Secretary of Veterans Affairs (2005–2007)
Rick Perry, U.S. Secretary of Energy (2017–2019) and Governor of Texas (2000–2015)
Reince Priebus, White House Chief of Staff (2017) and Chair of the Republican National Committee (2011–2017)
Anthony Principi, U.S. Secretary of Veterans Affairs (2001–2005) and U.S. Deputy Secretary of Veterans Affairs (1989–1992)
Jeff Sessions, U.S. Attorney General (2017–2018), U.S. Senator from Alabama (1997–2017), 44th Attorney General of Alabama (1995–1997), U.S. Attorney for the Southern District of Alabama (1981–1993)
Tommy Thompson, U.S. Secretary of Health and Human Services (2001–2005) and Governor of Wisconsin (1987–2001)
Matthew Whitaker, Acting U.S. Attorney General (2018–2019) and U.S. Attorney of the Southern District of Iowa (2004–2009)

White House officials 

Michael Anton, Deputy Assistant to the President for Strategic Communications (2017–2018)
Steve Bannon, White House Chief Strategist (2017)
Pat Buchanan, White House Communications Director (1985–1987)
Justin Clark, Director of Public Liaison (2018) and Director of Intergovernmental Affairs (2017–2018)
Kellyanne Conway, Counselor to the President (2017–2020)
Boris Epshteyn, White House Assistant Director of Communications for Surrogate Operations (2017)
Ari Fleischer, White House Press Secretary (2001–2003)
Daniel Gade, Associate Director of the Domestic Policy Council (2007–2008) and retired U.S. Army lieutenant colonel
Hogan Gidley, White House Deputy Press Secretary (2019–2020)
George Gigicios, White House Director of Scheduling and Advance (2017)
Ronny Jackson, Chief Medical Advisor to the President (2019), Physician to the President (2013–2018), retired U.S. Navy rear admiral and U.S. Representative from TX-13 (2021–present)
John McEntee, Personal Aide to the President (2017–2018)
Don McGahn, White House Counsel (2017–2018) and Chair of the Federal Election Commission (2008)
David McIntosh, Director of the Domestic Policy Council (1987–1988) and U.S. Representative from IN-02 (1995–2001)
Steve Munisteri, Director of the Office of Public Liaison (2018–2019) and Chair of the Texas Republican Party (2010–2015)
John Poindexter, National Security Advisor (1985–1986), Deputy National Security Advisor (1983–1985) and retired U.S. Navy vice admiral
Ed Rollins, Deputy Assistant to the President for Political Affairs (1980–81), Assistant to the President for Political Affairs (1981–83), Director of the Office of Political Affairs (1981–83) and Assistant to the President for Political and Governmental Affairs (1985)
Mike Roman, Special Assistant to the President and Director of Special Projects and Research (2017–2018)
Karl Rove, White House Deputy Chief of Staff (2005–2007)
Sarah Huckabee Sanders, White House Press Secretary (2017–2019)
Matt Schlapp, White House Director of Political Affairs (2003–2005), political activist, lobbyist, chairman of the American Conservative Union
Mercedes Schlapp, White House Director of Strategic Communications (2017–2019)
Bill Shine, White House Communications Director (2017–2019) and White House Deputy Chief of Staff for Communications (2018–2019)
Sean Spicer, White House Press Secretary (2017) and White House Communications Director (2017)
Bill Stepien, White House Director of Political Affairs (2017–2018)
Katie Walsh, White House Deputy Chief of Staff (2017)

Executive office officials 

 Nick Ayers, Chief of Staff to the Vice President (2017–2019)
 Gary Bauer, Assistant to the President for Policy Development (1987–1988), United States Under Secretary of Education (1985–1987) and United States Deputy Under Secretary of Education for Planning and Budget (1982–1985)
 Fred Fleitz, Chief of Staff and Executive Secretary of the National Security Council (2018)
 Sebastian Gorka, Deputy Assistant to the President (2017)
 Marc Lotter, Press Secretary to the Vice President (2017)
 Mary Matalin, Assistant to the President and Counsel to the Vice President (2001–2002)
 K.T. McFarland, Deputy National Security Advisor (2017)
 James C. Miller III, Director of the Office of Management and Budget (1985–1988)
 David Safavian, Administrator for Federal Procurement Policy (2004–2005)
Stephen J. Yates, Deputy National Security Advisor to the Vice President (2001–2005) and Chair of Idaho Republican Party (2014–2017)

Department of defense officials 

 Jed Babbin, Deputy Under Secretary of Defense for Acquisition Planning (1990–1991)
 William G. Boykin, Deputy Under Secretary of Defense for Intelligence (2002–2007), retired U.S. Army lieutenant general and vice president of Family Research Council
 Richard E. Brown, Assistant Vice Chief of Staff of the United States Air Force (2004) and retired U.S. Air Force lieutenant general
Thomas Carter, Deputy Assistant Secretary of Defense for Legislative Affairs (1989–1990) and retired U.S. Air Force major general
 Jim Courter, Chair of the Defense Base Closure and Realignment Commission (1991–1994) and U.S Representative from NJ-12 (1983–1991) and NJ-13 (1979–1983)
Michael Doran, Deputy Assistant Secretary for Public Diplomacy (2007–2008)
Gordon England, Acting U.S. Secretary of Defense (2009), U.S. Deputy Secretary of Defense (2005–2009) and U.S. Secretary of the Navy (2001–2003, 2003–2006)
 Jay Garner, Director of the Office for Reconstruction and Humanitarian Assistance (2003) and retired U.S. Army lieutenant general (Democrat)
Timothy F. Ghormley, Inspector General of the U.S. Marines Corp (1999–2001) and retired U.S. Marine Corps major general
Stan Green, Inspector General of the U.S. Army (2005–2008) and retired U.S. Army lieutenant general
Henry J. Hatch, Chief of Engineers (1988–1992) and retired U.S. Army lieutenant general
Thomas Hayward, Chief of Naval Operations (1978–1982) and retired U.S. Navy admiral
 Dennis Hejlik, Commander of the United States Marine Forces Special Operations Command (2006–2008) and retired U.S. Marine Corps lieutenant general
Van Hipp Jr, Deputy Assistant Secretary of the Army (Reserve Forces and Mobilization) (1990–1993) and Chair of the South Carolina Republican Party (1987–1989)
Gerald L. Hoewing, Chief of Naval Personnel (2002–2005) and retired U.S. Navy vice admiral
William K. James, Director of the Defense Mapping Agency (1990–1993) and retired U.S. Air Force major general
Jerome Johnson, Vice Chief of Naval Operations (1990–1992) and retired U.S. Navy admiral
Jon C. Kreitz, Deputy Director for Operations of the Defense POW/MIA Accounting Agency (2015–2019) and retired U.S. Navy rear admiral
Ty McCoy, Assistant Secretary of the Air Force (Manpower & Reserve Affairs) (1981–1988)
 William A. Navas Jr, Assistant Secretary of the Navy (Manpower and Reserve Affairs) (2001–2008) and retired U.S. Army major general
 Raymund E. O'Mara, Director of the Defense Mapping Agency (1993–1994) retired U.S. Air Force major general
Garry L. Parks, Deputy Commandant for Manpower and Reserve Affairs (2001–2004) and retired U.S. Marine Corps lieutenant general
 Marc Pelaez, Chief of Naval Research (1993–1996) and retired U.S. Navy rear admiral
Richard A. Scholtes, Commander of the Joint Special Operations Command (1980–1984) and retired U.S. Army major general
Leighton W. Smith Jr, Deputy Chief of Naval Operations for Plans, Policy and Operations (1991–1994) and retired U.S. Navy admiral
Robert Spalding, Defense Attaché to China (2016–2017), Senior Director for Strategic Planning (2017–2018) and retired U.S. Air Force brigadier general
James N. Stewart, Under Secretary of Defense for Personnel and Readiness (2018–2019), Assistant Secretary of Defense for Manpower and Reserve Affairs (2018–2019), and retired U.S. Air Force major general
Edward Straw, Director of the Defense Logistics Agency (1992–1996) and retired U.S. Navy vice admiral 
Steven A. White, Chief of Naval Material (1983–1985) and retired U.S. Navy admiral 
Nils Ronald Thunman, Deputy Chief of Naval Operations for Submarine Warfare (1981–1985) and retired U.S. Navy vice admiral
Michael W. Wooley, Commander of the Air Force Special Operations Command (2004–2007) and retired U.S. Air Force lieutenant general
Garland P. Wright, Deputy Director of the Defense Threat Reduction Agency (2010–2012) and retired U.S. Navy rear admiral
 Michael Wynne, Secretary of the Air Force (2005–2008)

Department of state officials and US ambassadaors 

 Robert I. Blau, Chargé d'Affaires ad interim to El Salvador (2009–2010)
Rudy Boschwitz, United States Ambassador to the United Nations Commission on Human Rights (2005–2006) and U.S. Senator from Minnesota (1978–1991)
Terry Branstad, U.S. Ambassador to China (2017–2020) and Governor of Iowa (1983–1999, 2011–2017)
Christopher Burnham, Under Secretary of State for Management (2005) and Under Secretary General of the United Nations for Management (2005–2006)
Robert B. Charles, Assistant Secretary of State for International Narcotics and Law Enforcement Affairs (2003–2005)
Charles Glazer, U.S. Ambassador to El Salvador (2007–2009)
Bill Hagerty, U.S. Ambassador to Japan (2017–2019) and U.S. Senator from Tennessee (2021–present)
Brad Higgins, Assistant Secretary of State for Resource Management (2006–2009)
Jon Huntsman Jr., U.S. Ambassador to Russia (2017–2019), U.S. Ambassador to China (2009–2011), Governor of Utah (2005–2009), 2012 Republican presidential candidate
Alan Keyes, Assistant Secretary of State for International Organization Affairs (1985–1987)
Douglas Kmiec, U.S. Ambassador to Malta (2009–2011) and the U.S. Assistant Attorney General to the Office of Legal Counsel (1988–1989)
Brenda Lagrange Johnson, U.S. Ambassador to Jamaica (2005–2009)
Mary Ourisman, U.S. Ambassador to Barbados (2006–2009), U.S. Ambassador to Saint Vincent and the Grenadines (2006–2009), U.S. Ambassador to Saint Lucia (2006–2009), U.S. Ambassador to Saint Kitts and Nevis (2006–2009), U.S. Ambassador to Antigua and Barbuda (2006–2009), U.S. Ambassador to Dominica (2006–2009), U.S. Ambassador to Grenada (2006–2009)
Jeanne Phillips, U.S. Ambassador to the Organisation for Economic Co-operation and Development (2001–2003)
Rodolphe M. Vallee, U.S. Ambassador to Slovakia (2005–2008)
Ron Weiser, U.S. Ambassador to Slovakia (2001–2004)

Department of justice officials 

 Bob Barr, U.S. Attorney for the Northern District of Georgia (1986–1990) and U.S. Representative from GA-07 (1995–2003) and Libertarian Party nominee for the 2008 presidential election
Chris Christie, U.S. Attorney for the District of New Jersey (2002–2008), Governor of New Jersey (2010–2018) and Republican candidate for President in 2016
Rudy Giuliani, United States Associate Attorney General (1981–1983) and Mayor of New York City, New York (1994–2001)
Frank Keating, United States Associate Attorney General (1988–1990), United States Deputy Secretary of Housing and Urban Development (1992–1993) and Governor of Oklahoma (1995–2003)
Tom Marino, U.S. Attorney for the Middle District of Pennsylvania (2002–2007) and U.S. Representative from PA-12 (2011–2019)
Andrew C. McCarthy, Assistant U.S. Attorney for the Southern District of New York (1986–2003)
 Alfred S. Regnery, Deputy Assistant Attorney General of the Land and Natural Resources Division (1981–1986)

Department of homeland security officials 

 Jay M. Cohen, Under Secretary of Homeland Security for Science and Technology (2006–2009) and retired U.S. Navy rear admiral
Thomas Homan, Director of the U.S. Immigration and Customs Enforcement (2017–2018)
 Paul Yost Jr, Commandant of the Coast Guard (1986–1990) and retired U.S. Coast Guard admiral

Other federal officials 

James J. Carey, Chair of the Federal Maritime Commission (1989–1991) and retired U.S. Navy rear admiral
Hal Daub, Chair of the Social Security Advisory Board (2002–2006), U.S. Representative from NE-02 (1981–1989) and Mayor of Omaha, Nebraska (1995–2001)
Deecy Gray, Delegate to the United Nations (2019)
Jason Greenblatt, Special Representative for International Negotiations (2017–2019)
Kevin Hassett, Chair of the Council of Economic Advisers (2017–2019)
John W. Nicholson, Under Secretary of Veterans Affairs for Memorial Affairs (2003–2005) and retired U.S. Army brigadier general
Orson Swindle, Commissioner of the Federal Trade Commission (1997–2005)

Military personnel

Air Force

John R. Allen Jr, retired U.S. Air Force brigadier general 
John Closner, retired U.S. Air Force major general
Sam Clovis, former U.S. Air Force officer, talk radio host, political figure
Harold A. Fritz, Medal of Honor recipient and retired U.S. Air Force lieutenant colonel
Alfred G. Hansen, retired U.S. Air Force general
Timothy A. Kinnan, retired U.S. Air Force lieutenant general
Brian Kolfage, U.S. Air Force veteran, founder of We Build The Wall
John D. Logeman, retired U.S. Air Force major general
William R. Looney III, retired U.S. Air Force general
Thomas McInerney, retired U.S. Air Force lieutenant general
Hans Mueh, retired U.S. Air Force brigadier general
Robert C. Oaks, retired U.S. Air Force general
Scott O'Grady, U.S. Air Force veteran
August Pfluger, retired U.S. Air Force lieutenant colonel and U.S. Representative from TX-11 (2021–present)
Nels Running, retired U.S. Air Force major general
Richard Secord, retired U.S. Air Force major general
Ellie G. Shuler Jr, retired U.S. Air Force lieutenant general
Lance L. Smith, retired U.S. Air Force general
William E. Thurman, retired U.S. Air Force lieutenant general
Thomas C. Waskow, retired U.S. Air Force lieutenant general

Army

Gary B. Beikirch, Medal of Honor recipient and former U.S. Army soldier
Burwell B. Bell III, retired U.S. Army general
Stephen M. Bliss, retired U.S. Army brigadier general
Donald C. Bolduc, retired U.S. Army brigadier general
Patrick Henry Brady, Medal of Honor recipient and retired U.S. Army major general
Mike Cernovich, former U.S. Army National Guard second lieutenant
Sammy L. Davis, Medal of Honor recipient and retired U.S. Army soldier
Robert F. Dees, retired U.S. Army major general
Roger Donlon, Medal of Honor recipient and retired U.S. Army colonel
Stacy Garrity, retired U.S. Army colonel and Pennsylvania State Treasurer (2021–present)
Jeffrey Hammond, retired U.S. Army major general
Gary L. Harrell, retired U.S. Army major general
Bobby Henline, former U.S. Army soldier and stand-up comedian
John E. James, U.S. Army veteran and the Republican nominee for the 2018 and 2020 United States Senate elections in Michigan
James H. Johnson, retired U.S. Army lieutenant general
Clint Lorance, former U.S. Army officer and convicted war criminal
Ronald S. Magnum, retired U.S. Army brigadier general
James McCloughan, Medal of Honor recipient and former U.S. Army combat medic
Robert Martin Patterson, Medal of Honor recipient and retired U.S. Army command sergeant major
Leroy Petry, Medal of Honor recipient and retired U.S. Army master sergeant
Félix Rodríguez, retired U.S. Army Special Forces colonel
Clint Romesha, Medal of Honor recipient and former U.S. Army soldier
Anthony Shaffer, retired U.S. Army Reserve lieutenant colonel and President of London Center for Policy Research
Alek Skarlatos, former U.S. Army National Guard soldier who thwarted a terrorist attack on a Thalys train
Paul E. Vallely, retired U.S. Army major general
Ronald L. Watts, retired U.S. Army lieutenant general
Robert Wetzel, retired U.S. Army lieutenant general
John W. Woodmansee, retired U.S. Army lieutenant general
Walter H. Yates, retired U.S. Army major general
Albert C. Zapanta, retired U.S. Army major general

Coast Guard 

Donald C. Thompson, retired U.S. Coast Guard vice admiral
Howard Thorsen, retired U.S. Coast Guard vice admiral

Marine Corps
Emil R. Bedard, retired U.S. Marine Corps lieutenant general
Matthew T. Cooper, retired U.S. Marine Corps lieutenant general
Sarah Deal, first female U.S. Marine Corps aviator
Gene Deegan, retired U.S. Marine Corps major general
John S. Grinalds, retired U.S. Marine Corps major general
Earl B. Hailston, retired U.S. Marine Corps lieutenant general
James Livingston, Medal of Honor recipient and retired U.S. Marine Corps major general
Jarvis Lynch, retired U.S. Marine Corps major general
Oliver North, retired U.S. Marine Corps lieutenant colonel and President of National Rifle Association
Ronald G. Richard, retired U.S. Marine Corps major general
Woody Williams, Medal of Honor recipient and retired U.S. Marine Corps warrant officer

Navy

Edward S. Briggs, retired U.S. Navy vice admiral
Mark Fitzgerald, retired U.S. Navy admiral
Eddie Gallagher, former U.S. Navy SEAL and accused war criminal
William J. Hancock, retired U.S. Navy vice admiral
Gordon S. Holder, retired U.S. Navy vice admiral
Robert J. O'Neill, former U.S. Navy SEAL who is believed to have killed Osama Bin Laden
Craig Sawyer, former U.S. Navy SEAL
Robert H. Shumaker, retired U.S. Navy rear admiral
Robert J. Spane, retired U.S. Navy vice admiral
Michael E. Thornton, Medal of Honor recipient and retired U.S. Navy SEAL
Jerry Unruh, retired U.S. Navy vice admiral

U.S. Senators

Current

Lamar Alexander, U.S. Senator from Tennessee (2003–2021) and 45th Governor of Tennessee (1979–1987)
John Barrasso, U.S. Senator from Wyoming (2007–present)
Marsha Blackburn, U.S. Senator from Tennessee (2019–present)
Roy Blunt, U.S. Senator from Missouri (2011–present)
John Boozman, U.S. Senator from Arkansas (2011–present)
Richard Burr, U.S. Senator from North Carolina (2005–present)
Shelley Moore Capito, U.S. Senator from West Virginia (2015–present)
Bill Cassidy, U.S. Senator from Louisiana (2015–present) 
John Cornyn, U.S. Senator from Texas (2002–present) and Chair of the Senate Narcotics Caucus (2019–2021)
Tom Cotton, U.S. Senator from Arkansas (2015–present)
Kevin Cramer, U.S. Senator from North Dakota (2019–present)
Mike Crapo, U.S. Senator from Idaho (1999–present)
Ted Cruz, U.S. Senator from Texas (2013–present)
Steve Daines, U.S. Senator from Montana (2015–present) and U.S. Representative from MT-AL (2013–2015)
Mike Enzi, U.S. Senator from Wyoming (1997–2021)
Joni Ernst, U.S. Senator from Iowa (2015–present)
Deb Fischer, U.S. Senator from Nebraska (2013–present)
Zoraida Fonalledas, Shadow Senator from Puerto Rico (2017–present)
Cory Gardner, U.S. Senator from Colorado (2015–2021) and U.S Representative from CO-4 (2011–2015)
Lindsey Graham, U.S. Senator from South Carolina (2003–present), U.S. Representative from SC-3 (1995–2003) and candidate for president in 2016
Chuck Grassley, U.S. Senator from Iowa and President pro tempore emeritus of the United States Senate (1981–present)
Josh Hawley, U.S. Senator from Missouri (2019–present)
Cindy Hyde-Smith, U.S. Senator from Mississippi (2018–present)
Jim Inhofe, U.S. Senator from Oklahoma (1994–present)
Ron Johnson, U.S. Senator from Wisconsin (2011–present) and Chair of the Senate Homeland Security and Governmental Affairs Committee (2015-2021)
John Kennedy, U.S. Senator from Louisiana (2017–present)
James Lankford, U.S. Senator from Oklahoma (2015–present) and U.S. Representative from OK-5 (2011–2015)
Mike Lee, U.S. Senator from Utah (2011–present)
Kelly Loeffler, U.S. Senator from Georgia (2020–2021)
Mitch McConnell, U.S. Senator from Kentucky (1985–present) and Senate Majority Leader (2015–2021)
Martha McSally, U.S. Senator from Arizona (2019–2020) and U.S. Representative from AZ-02 (2015–2019)
Rand Paul, U.S. Senator from Kentucky (2011–present)
David Perdue, U.S. Senator from Georgia (2015–2021)
Rob Portman, U.S. Senator from Ohio (2011–present) 
Jim Risch, U.S. Senator from Idaho (2009–present)
Mike Rounds, U.S. Senator from South Dakota (2015–present)
Marco Rubio, U.S. Senator from Florida (2011–present)
Rick Scott, Governor of Florida (2011–2019), U.S. Senator from Florida (2019–present)
Tim Scott, U.S. Senator from South Carolina (2013–present)
Richard Shelby, U.S. Senator from Alabama (1987–present)
Dan Sullivan, U.S. Senator from Alaska (2015–present)
John Thune, Senate Majority Whip (2019–2021) U.S. Senator from South Dakota (2005–present)
Thom Tillis, U.S. Senator from North Carolina (2015–present)
Pat Toomey, U.S. Senator from Pennsylvania (2011–present) 
Roger Wicker, U.S. Senator from Mississippi (2007–present)

Former
 Hank Brown, U.S. Senator from Colorado (1991-1997)
Ben Nighthorse Campbell, U.S. Senator from Colorado (1993–2005) and U.S. Representative from CO-03 (1987–1993)
Norm Coleman, U.S. Senator from Minnesota (2003–2009) and Mayor of St. Paul (1994–2002)
Jim DeMint, U.S. Senator from South Carolina (2005–2013) and U.S. Representative from SC-04 (1999–2005)
Orrin Hatch, U.S. Senator from Utah and former president pro tempore of the United States Senate (1977–2019)
Dean Heller, U.S. Senator from Nevada (2011–2019)
Tim Hutchinson, U.S. Senator of Arkansas (1997–2003)
Connie Mack III, U.S. Senator from Florida (1989–2001)
Jim Talent, U.S. Senator from Missouri (2002–2007)
Pete Wilson, U.S. Senator from California (1983–1991), Governor of California (1991–1999)

U.S. Representatives

Current

Ralph Abraham, U.S. Representative from LA-05 (2015–2021)
Robert Aderholt, U.S. Representative from AL-04 (1997–present)
Rick W. Allen, U.S. Representative from GA-12 (2015–present)
Mark Amodei, U.S. Representative from NV-02 (2011–present)
Kelly Armstrong, U.S. Representative from ND-AL (2019–present)
Jodey Arrington, U.S. Representative from TX-19 (2017–present)
Don Bacon, U.S. Representative from NE-02 (2017–present)
Troy Balderson, U.S. Representative from OH-12 (2018–present)
Jack Bergman, U.S. Representative from MI-01 (2017–present)
Andy Biggs, U.S. Representative from AZ-05 (2017–present)
Gus Bilirakis, U.S. Representative from FL-12 (2013–present)
Dan Bishop, U.S. Representative from NC-09 (2019–present)
Rob Bishop, U.S. Representative from UT-01 (2003–2021)
Mike Bost, U.S. Representative from IL-12 (2015–present)
Kevin Brady, U.S. Representative from TX-08 (1997–present)
Mo Brooks, U.S. Representative from AL-05 (2011–present)
Ken Buck, U.S. Representative from CO-04 (2011–present)
Vern Buchanan, U.S. Representative from FL-16 (2013–present) and FL-13 (2007–2013)
Ted Budd, U.S. Representative from NC-13 (2017–present)
Tim Burchett, U.S. Representative from TN-02 (2019–present)
Ken Calvert, U.S. Representative from CA-42 (2013–present), CA-44 (2003–2013) and CA-43 (1993–2003)
Buddy Carter, U.S. Representative from GA-01 (2015–present)
John Carter, U.S. Representative from TX-31 (2003–present)
Steve Chabot, U.S. Representative from OH-01 (1995–2009, 2011–present)
Liz Cheney, U.S. Representative from WY-AL (2017–present) 
Doug Collins, U.S. Representative from GA-09 (2013–2021)
James Comer, U.S. Representative from KY-01 (2016–present)
Rick Crawford, U.S. Representative from AR-01 (2011–present)
Dan Crenshaw, U.S. Representative from TX-02 (2019–present) and former U.S. Navy SEAL
Warren Davidson, U.S. Representative from OH-08 (2016–present)
Rodney Davis, U.S. Representative from IL-13 (2013–present)
Scott DesJarlais, U.S. Representative from TN-04 (2011–present)
Mario Diaz-Balart, U.S. Representative from FL-25 (2013–present, 2003–2011), and FL-21 (2011–2013)
Jeff Duncan, U.S. Representative from SC-03 (2011–present)
Neal Dunn, U.S. Representative from FL-02 (2017–present)
Tom Emmer, U.S. Representative from MN-06 (2015–present)
Drew Ferguson, U.S. Representative from GA-03 (2017–present)
Chuck Fleischmann, U.S. Representative from TN-03 (2011–present)
Jeff Fortenberry, U.S. Representative from NE-01 (2005–2022)
Luis Fortuño, Shadow Representative from Puerto Rico (2017–present), Governor of Puerto Rico (2009–2013), Resident Commissioner of Puerto Rico (2005–2009)
Virginia Foxx, U.S. Representative from NC-05 (2005–present)
Russ Fulcher, U.S. Representative from ID-01 (2019–present)
Matt Gaetz, U.S. Representative from FL-01 (2017–present)
Mike Gallagher, U.S. Representative from WI-08 (2017–present)
Mike Garcia, U.S. Representative from CA-25 (2020–present)
Greg Gianforte, U.S. Representative from MT-AL (2017–2021) and 2020 Republican nominee for Governor of Montana
Bob Gibbs, U.S. Representative from OH-07 (2013–present) and OH-18 (2011–2013)
Jenniffer González, U.S. Delegate from Puerto Rico (2017–present)
Anthony Gonzalez, U.S. Representative from OH-16 (2019–present) 
Paul Gosar, U.S. Representative from AZ-04 (2013–present) and AZ-01 (2011–2013)
Sam Graves, U.S. Representative from MO-06 (2001–present)
Garret Graves, U.S. Representative from LA-06 (2015–present)
Tom Graves, U.S. Representative from GA-14 (2013–2020), GA-09 (2010–2013)
Glenn Grothman, U.S. Representative from WI-06 (2015–present)
Mark Green, U.S. Representative from TN-07 (2019–present)
Michael Guest, U.S. Representative from MS-03 (2019–present)
Jim Hagedorn, U.S. Representative from MN-01 (2019–2022)
Andy Harris, U.S. Representative from MD-01 (2011–present) 
Vicky Hartzler, U.S. Representative from MO-04 (2011–present)
Kevin Hern, U.S. Representative from OK-01 (2018–present)
Jaime Herrera Beutler, U.S. Representative from WA-03 (2011–present) 
Jody Hice, U.S. Representative from GA-10 (2015–present)
Clay Higgins, U.S. Representative from LA-03 (2017–present)
French Hill, U.S. Representative from AR-02 (2015–present)
George Holding, U.S. Representative from NC-02 (2017–2021) and NC-13 (2013–2017)
Richard Hudson, U.S. Representative from NC-08 (2013–present)
Bill Huizenga, U.S. Representative from MI-02 (2011–present)
Chris Jacobs, U.S. Representative from NY-27 (2020–present)
Bill Johnson, U.S. Representative from OH-06 (2011–present)
Dusty Johnson, U.S. Representative from SD-AL (2019–present) and member of the South Dakota Public Utilities Commission (2005–2011)
Mike Johnson, U.S. Representative from LA-04 (2017–present)
Jim Jordan, U.S. Representative from OH-04 (2007–present)
David Joyce, U.S. Representative from OH-14 (2013–present)
John Joyce, U.S. Representative from PA-13 (2019–present)
John Katko, U.S. Representative from NY-24 (2015–present) 
Fred Keller, U.S. Representative from PA-12 (2019–present)
Mike Kelly, U.S. Representative from PA-16 (2011–present)
Trent Kelly, U.S. Representative from MS-01 (2015–present)
Peter King, U.S. Representative from NY-02 (1993–2021)
Adam Kinzinger, U.S. Representative from IL-16 (2013–present) and IL-11 (2011–2013) 
David Kustoff, U.S. Representative from TN-08 (2017–present)
Darin LaHood, U.S. Representative from IL-18 (2015–present)
Doug Lamborn, U.S. Representative from CO-05 (2007–present)
Bob Latta, U.S. Representative from OH-05 (2007–present)
Debbie Lesko, U.S. Representative from AZ-08 (2018–present)
Billy Long, U.S. Representative from MO-07 (2011–present)
Barry Loudermilk, U.S. Representative from GA-11 (2015–present)
Frank Lucas, U.S. Representative from OK-03 (2003–present) and OK-06 (1994–2003)
Blaine Luetkemeyer, U.S. Representative from MO-03 (2013–present) and MO-09 (2009–2013)
Thomas Massie, U.S. Representative from KY-04 (2012–present)
Brian Mast, U.S. Representative from FL-18 (2017–present)
Kevin McCarthy, U.S. Representative from CA-23 (2007–present); House Majority Leader (2014–2019); House Minority Leader (2019–present)
Patrick McHenry, U.S. Representative from NC-10 (2005–present)
David McKinley, U.S. Representative from WV-01 (2011–present)
Tom McClintock, U.S. Representative from California's 4th congressional district (2009–present)
Dan Meuser, U.S. Representative from PA-09 (2019–present)
Carol Miller, U.S. Representative from WV-03 (2019–present)
Paul Mitchell, U.S. Representative from MI-10 (2017–2021)
John Moolenaar, U.S. Representative from MI-04 (2015–present)
Alex Mooney, U.S. Representative from WV-02 (2015–present)
Markwayne Mullin, U.S. Representative from OK-02 (2013–present)
Greg Murphy, U.S. Representative from NC-03 (2019–present)
Dan Newhouse, U.S. Representative from WA-04 (2015–present) 
Ralph Norman, U.S. Representative from SC-05 (2017–present)
Devin Nunes, U.S. Representative from CA-22 (2013–2022) and CA-21 (2003–2013)
Steven Palazzo, U.S. Representative from MS-04 (2011–present)
Gary Palmer, U.S. Representative from AL-6 (2015–present)
Greg Pence, U.S. Representative from IN-6 (2019–present), brother of Vice President Mike Pence
Scott Perry, U.S. Representative from PA-10 (2013–present)
Bill Posey, U.S. Representative from FL-08 (2013–present) and FL-15 (2009–2013)
Amata Coleman Radewagen, U.S. Delegate from AS-AL (2015–present)
Tom Reed, U.S. Representative from NY-29 (2010–2013), NY-23 (2013–present)
Guy Reschenthaler, U.S. Representative from PA-14 (2019–present)
Tom Rice, U.S. Representative from SC-07 (2013–present) 
Denver Riggleman, U.S. Representative from VA-5 (2019–2021) (Withdrew endorsement) 
Cathy McMorris Rodgers, U.S. Representative from WA-05 (2005–present)
Phil Roe, U.S. Representative from TN-01 (2009–2021)
Mike Rogers, U.S. Representative from AL-03 (2003–present)
John Rose, U.S. Representative from TN-06 (2019–present)
David Rouzer, U.S. Representative from NC-07 (2015–present)
John Rutherford, U.S. Representative from FL-04 (2017–present)
Steve Scalise, U.S. Representative from LA-1 (2008–present); House Majority Whip (2014–2019); House Minority Whip (2019–present)
David Schweikert, U.S. Representative from AZ-06 (2013–present) and AZ-05 (2011–2013)
Austin Scott, U.S. Representative from GA-08 (2011–present)
Jim Sensenbrenner, U.S. Representative from WI-05 (2003–2021) and WI-09 (1979–2003)
John Shimkus, U.S. Representative from IL-15 (2013–2021), IL-19 (2003–2019) and IL-15 (1997–2003) (Withdrew endorsement) 
Michael Simpson, U.S. Representative from ID-02 (1999–present)
Adrian Smith, U.S. Representative from NE-03 (2007–present)
Chris Smith, U.S. Representative from NJ-04 (1981–present)
Jason Smith, U.S. Representative from MO-08 (2013–present)
Lloyd Smucker, U.S. Representative from PA-11 (2019–present) and PA-16 (2017–2019)
Ross Spano, U.S. Representative from FL-15 (2019–2021)
Pete Stauber, U.S. Representative from MN-08 (2019–present)
Elise Stefanik, U.S. Representative from NY-21 (2015–present)
Bryan Steil, U.S. Representative from WI-01 (2019–present)
Greg Steube, U.S. Representative from FL-19 (2019–present)
Chris Stewart, U.S. Representative from UT-02 (2013–present)
Steve Stivers, U.S. Representative from OH-15 (2011–2021)
Glenn Thompson, U.S. Representative from PA-15 (2009–present)
Tom Tiffany, U.S. Representative from WI-07 (2020–present)
William Timmons, U.S. Representative from SC-04 (2019–present)
Scott Tipton, U.S. Representative from CO-3 (2011–2021)
Mike Turner, U.S. Representative from OH-10 (2013–present) and OH-03 (2003–2013)
Jeff Van Drew, U.S. Representative from NJ-02 (2019–present) (Formerly Democratic, Republican since 2020)
Ann Wagner, U.S. Representative from MO-02 (2013–present) and U.S. Ambassador to Luxembourg (2005–2009)
Mark Walker, U.S. Representative from NC-06 (2015–2021)
Michael Waltz, U.S. Representative from FL-06 (2019–present)
Steve Watkins, U.S. Representative from KS-02 (2019–2021)
Daniel Webster, U.S. Representative from FL-11 (2017–present), FL-10 (2013–2017) and FL-08 (2011–2013)
Brad Wenstrup, U.S. Representative from OH-02 (2013–present)
Bruce Westerman, U.S. Representative from AR-04 (2015–present)
Roger Williams, U.S. Representative from TX-25 (2013–present)
Joe Wilson, U.S. Representative from SC-02 (2001–present)
Rob Wittman, U.S. Representative from VA-01 (2007–present)
Steve Womack, U.S. Representative from AR-03 (2011–present)
Rob Woodall, U.S. Representative from GA-07 (2011–2021)
Ted Yoho, U.S. Representative from FL-3 (2013–2021)
Don Young, U.S. Representative from AK-ATL (1973–2022)
Lee Zeldin, U.S. Representative from NY-1 (2015–present)

Former

Steve Austria, U.S. Representative from OH-07 (2009–2013)
Michele Bachmann, U.S. Representative from MN-06 (2007–2015)
Lou Barletta, U.S. Representative from PA-11 (2011–2019), Mayor of Hazleton, Pennsylvania (2000–2010)
Joe Barton, U.S. Representative from TX-06 (1985–2019)
Kerry Bentivolio, U.S. Representative from MI-11 (2013–2015)
Rod Blum, U.S. Representative from IA-01 (2015–2019)
Jason Chaffetz, U.S. Representative from UT-03 (2009–2017)
Thelma Drake, U.S. Representative from VA-02 (2005–2009)
Sean Duffy, U.S. Representative from WI-07 (2011–2019)
Bob Ehrlich, U.S. Representative from MD-02 (1995–2003) and Governor of Maryland (2003–2007)
Renee Ellmers, U.S. Representative from NC-02 (2011–2017)
John Faso, U.S. Representative from NY-19 (2017–2019)
Randy Forbes, U.S. Representative from VA-04 (2001–2017)
Vito Fossella, U.S. Representative from NY-13 (1997–2009)
Trent Franks, U.S. Representative from AZ-08 (2013–2017) and AZ-02 (2003–2013)
Newt Gingrich, U.S. Speaker of the House (1995–1999), U.S. Representative from GA-06 (1979–1999)
Gil Gutknecht, U.S. Representative from MN-01 (1995–2007)
Karen Handel, U.S. Representative from GA-06 (2017–2019), Secretary of State of Georgia (2007–2010), and 2020 Republican Nominee for GA-06
Nan Hayworth, U.S. Representative from NY-19 (2011–2013)
Tim Huelskamp, U.S. Representative from KS-01 (2011–2017)
Duncan Hunter, U.S. Representative from CA-50 (2009–2020)
Darrell Issa, U.S. Representative from CA-49 (2001–2019) and CA-50 (2021–present)
Jack Kingston, U.S. Representative from GA-01 (1993–2015)
Raul Labrador, U.S. Representative from ID-01 (2011–2019) and Chair of the Idaho Republican Party (2019–2020)
Jason Lewis, U.S. Representative from MN-02 (2017–2019)
Robert Livingston, U.S. Representative from LA-01 (1977–1999)
Cynthia Lummis, U.S. Representative from WY-ATL (2009–2017) and U.S. Senator from Wyoming (2021–present)
Bob McEwen, U.S. Representative from OH-06 (1981–1993)
Doug Ose, U.S. Representative from CA-03 (1999–2005)
Bruce Poliquin, U.S. Representative from ME-02 (2015–2019)
Jim Renacci, U.S. Representative from OH-16 (2011–2019)
Donald Ritter, U.S. Representative from PA-15 (1979–1993)
Dana Rohrabacher, U.S. Representative from CA-48 (2013–2019), CA-46 (2003–2013), CA-45 (1993–2003) and CA-42 (1989–1993)
Todd Rokita, U.S. Representative from IN-04 (2011–2019), Secretary of State of Indiana (2002–2010), and Attorney General of Indiana (2021–present)
Keith Rothfus, U.S. Representative from PA-12 (2013–2019)
Jim Ryun, U.S. Representative from KS-02 (1996–2007)
Bobby Schilling, U.S. Representative from IL-17 (2011–2013)
Bill Schuette, U.S. Representative from MI-10 (1985–1991) and Attorney General of Michigan (2011–2019)
Pete Sessions, U.S. Representative from TX-32 (2003–2019), TX-05 (1997–2003), and TX-17 (2021–present) 
Norman Shumway, U.S. Representative from CA-14 (1979–1991)
Rob Simmons, U.S. Representative from CT-02 (2001–2007)
Scott Taylor, U.S. Representative from VA-02 (2017–2019)
Claudia Tenney, U.S. Representative from NY-22 (2017–2019, 2021–present)
David Valadao, U.S. Representative from CA-21 (2013–2019, 2021–present) 
Zach Wamp, U.S. Representative from TN-03 (1995–2011)
David Young, U.S. Representative from IA-03 (2015–2019)

Municipal and local officials

Mayors and county executives

Current
David Alexander, Mayor of Franklin County, Tennessee (2018–present)
Steve Bakken, Mayor of Bismarck, North Dakota (2018–present)
Brandon Bochenski, Mayor of Grand Forks, North Dakota (2020–present) and former Kazakhstani professional ice hockey player
Bill Currier, Mayor of Adair Village, Oregon (2007–present)
Lenny Curry, Mayor of Jacksonville, Florida (2015–present) and Chair of the Florida Republican Party (2011–2014)
Bobby Dyer, Mayor of Virginia Beach, Virginia (2018–present)
Paul Farrow, County Executive of Waukesha County (2015–present)
Lou Gargiulo, Chair of the Hampton Falls Board of Selectmen (2019–present)
Carlos Giménez, Mayor of Miami-Dade County, Florida (2011–present) and 2020 Republican nominee for FL-26
Randy Henderson, Mayor of Fort Myers, Florida (2009–present)
John Lee, Mayor of North Las Vegas, Nevada (2013–present) (Democrat)
Carlos Rendo, Mayor of Woodcliff Lake, New Jersey (2016–present)
Jean Stothert, Mayor of Omaha, Nebraska (2013–present)
Jerry Weiers, Mayor of Glendale, Arizona (2013–present)

Former
Jason Anavitarte, Mayor pro tempore of Doraville, Georgia (2004–2009)
Rob Astorino, County Executive of Westchester County (2010–2017) and member of the Westchester County Board of Legislators from District 3 (2003–2004)
Charles Evers, Mayor of Fayette, Mississippi (1969–1981, 1985–1989) (Deceased)
Jim Greer, Deputy Mayor of Oviedo, Florida (2004–2008) and Chair of the Florida Republican Party (2006–2010)
Marilyn John, Mayor of Shelby, Ohio (2010–2015)
Steve Lonegan, Mayor of Bogota, New Jersey (1995–2008)
Rita Sanders, Mayor of Bellevue, Nebraska (2010–2015)
Thurston Smith, Mayor of Hesperia, California (2008–2014)
Beth Van Duyne, Mayor of Irving, Texas (2011–2017) and U.S. Representative from TX-24 (2021–present)

Municipal executive officials

Current 
James Craig, Chief of the Detroit Police Department  (2013–present)
Bob Gualtieri, Sheriff of Pinellas County, Florida (2011–present)
Thomas M. Hodgson, Sheriff of Bristol County, Massachusetts (1997–present)
David Hooten, County Clerk of Oklahoma County (2017–present)
Mark Lamb, Sheriff of Pinal County, Arizona (2017–present)
Joe Lombardo, Sheriff of Clark County, Nevada (2015–present)
Troy Nehls, Sheriff of Fort Bend County, Texas (2013–present) and Republican nominee for Texas's 22nd congressional district
William Snyder, Sheriff of Martin County, Florida (2013–present)
Jeff Wilson, Port of Longview Commissioner (2016–present)

Former
Joe Arpaio, Sheriff of Maricopa County, Arizona (1993–2017)
David Clarke, Sheriff of Milwaukee County, Wisconsin (2002–2017) (Democrat)
Mark Curran, Sheriff of Lake County, Illinois (2006–2018)
Emilio Gonzalez, Chief Administrative Officer of the City of Miami (2018–2020)
Bernard Kerik, Commissioner of the New York City Police Department (2000–2001) and convicted felon (Granted pardon by Trump in February 2020)
Sandra O'Brien, Auditor of Ashtabula County (1994–2007)
Carl Paladino, member of the Buffalo Public Schools Board of Education from the Park District (2013–2017)
Leticia Remauro, Chair of the Staten Island Community Board 1 (2009–2015)
Carolyn Bunny Welsh, Sheriff of Chester County, Pennsylvania (2000–2020)

Municipal judicial officials

Current 

 Lucas Babin, District Attorney of Tyler County, Texas (2018–present)

Former 

 Jenna Ellis, Deputy District Attorney of Weld County, Colorado (2012–2013)
 Thomas P. Maney, County Judge of Okaloosa County (1989–2018)
 Jeanine Pirro, District Attorney of Westchester County (1994–2005) and host of Justice with Judge Jeanine

Municipal legislative officials

Current 

 Nan Baker, member of the Cuyahoga County Council from District 1 (2017–present)
Webster Barnaby, member of the Deltona City Commission from District 2 (2011–present)
 Annie Black, member of the Mesquite City Council (2018–present)
Joe Borelli, member of the New York City Council from District 51 (2015–present)
Skip Brandt, member of the Idaho County Board of Commissioners (2007–present)
Jerry Carl, member of the Mobile County Commission from District 3 (2012–present) and U.S. Representative from AL-01 (2021–present)
Roger Conley, member of the Vienna City Council (2016–present)
Scott Franklin, member of the Lakeland City Commission from the Southeast District (2018–present) and U.S. Representative from FL-15 (2021–present)
Michele Fiore, member of the Las Vegas City Council from Ward 6 (2017–present), Mayor Pro Tem of Las Vegas (2019–2020) and member of the Nevada Assembly from District 4 (2012–2016)
Jeff Johnson, member of the Hennepin County Board of Commissioners from District 7 (2009–present)
Barbara Kirkmeyer, member of the Weld County Board of County Commissioners from District 3 (2008–present, 1993–2001)
Paul Koering, member of the Crow Wing County Board from District 1 (2017–present)
Steven Matteo, member of the New York City Council from District 50 (2014–present)
Sean Morrison, member of the Cook County Board of Commissioners from District 17 (2015–present)
Peter Oberacker, member of the Ostego County Board of Representatives from District 6 (2015–present)
Joshua Parsons, member of the Lancaster County Board of Commissioners (2016–present)
Andres Pico, member of the Colorado Springs City Council from District 6 (2013–present)
Alex Rizo, Vice Chair of the Miami-Dade County Community Council 5 (2015–present)
Victoria Seaman, member of the Las Vegas City Council from the 2nd Ward (2019–present) and member of the Nevada Assembly from District 34 (2014–2019)
Rich Pahls, member of the Omaha City Council from District 5 (2013–present)
Michelle Steel, member of the Orange County Board of Supervisors from District 2 (2015–present)and U.S. Representative from CA-48 (2021–present)
Eric Ulrich, member of the New York City Council from District 32 (2009–present)
Tonya Van Beber, member of the Weld County Council from the At-Large District (2018–present)
Mark Waller, member of the Board of El Paso County Commissioners from District 2 (2016–present)
Wayne W. Williams, member of the Colorado Springs City Council from the At-Large District (2019–present) and Secretary of State of Colorado (2015–2019)
Aimee Winder Newton, member of the Salt Lake County Council from District 3 (2013–present)
Jack Woodrum, member of Summers County Commission (2010–present)
Jeff Zenger, member of the Lewisville Town Council (2010–present)

Former 

 Michael Berry, member of the Houston City Council from the At-Large Position 5 District (2004–2008) and At-Large Position 4 District (2002–2004)
 Jeff Cardwell, member of the Indianapolis City-County Council from District 23 (2008–2013)
 Eugene Delgaudio, member of the Loudoun County Board of Supervisors from the Sterling District (2000–2015)
 Carl DeMaio, member of the San Diego City Council from District 5 (2008–2012)
 Erick Erickson, member of the Macon City Council from Ward 5 (2007–2011) and conservative commentator
 Bob Good, member of the Campbell County Board of Supervisors (2016–2019) and U.S. Representative from VA-05 (2021–present)
 Andrew Stein, President of the New York City Council (1986–1994) and Borough President of Manhattan (1978–1985) (Democrat)
 Corey Stewart, Chair of the Prince William Board of County Supervisors (2006–2019) and Occoquan District Supervisor (2003–2006)
 Bruce Woodbury, member of the Clark County Commission from District A (1981–2009)

International politicians

Heads of State and Government

Current 
Jair Bolsonaro, President of Brazil (2019–present) (Independent)
Muhammadu Buhari, President of Nigeria (1983–1985, 2015–present) (All Progressives Congress)
Milorad Dodik, Serb Member of the Presidency of Bosnia and Herzegovina (2018–present) (Alliance of Independent Social Democrats)
Andrzej Duda, President of Poland (2015–present) (Law and Justice)
Andrej Babiš, Prime Minister of the Czech Republic (2017–2021) (ANO 2011)
Rodrigo Duterte, President of the Philippines (2016–2022) (PDP–Laban)
Janez Janša, Prime Minister of Slovenia (2004–2008, 2012–2013, 2020–present) (Slovenian Democratic Party)
Narendra Modi, Prime Minister of India (2014–present) (Bharatiya Janata Party)
Viktor Orbán, Prime Minister of Hungary (1998–2002, 2010–present) (Fidesz)
Aleksandar Vučić, President of Serbia (2017–present) (Serbian Progressive Party)
Pōhiva Tuʻiʻonetoa, Prime Minister of Tonga (2019–present) (People's Party)

Former 

 Tony Abbott, Prime Minister of Australia (2013–2015) (Liberal Party)
 Stephen Harper, Prime Minister of Canada (2006-2015) (Conservative Party)

Deputy Heads of State and Government

Current 
Ivica Dačić, Deputy Prime Minister of Serbia (2014–present), Ministry of Foreign Affairs (2014–present) and President of the Socialist Party of Serbia
Jarosław Kaczyński, Deputy Prime Minister of Poland (2020–present), Prime Minister of Poland (2006–2007) (Law and Justice)

Former 
Barnaby Joyce, Deputy Prime Minister of Australia (2017–2018) (National Party)
Matteo Salvini, Deputy Prime Minister of Italy (2018–2019) (League)
Vojislav Šešelj, Deputy Prime Minister of Serbia (1998–2000) (Serbian Radical Party)

Other executive officials

Current 

Aryeh Deri, Israeli Minister for the Development of the Periphery, the Negev and the Galilee (2015–present), Minister of the Interior (2016–present), Minister of Internal Affairs (1988–1992, 1993), Minister without Portfolio (1993), Minister of the Economy (2015), Minister of Religious Services (2018) and Leader of Shas
Alexander Downer, Minister for Foreign Affairs (1996–2007), High Commissioner of Australia to the United Kingdom (2014–2018) and member of the Australian Parliament for Mayo (1984–2008) (Liberal Party of Australia)

Former 

Femi Fani-Kayode, Nigerian Minister of Culture and Tourism (2006) and Minister of Aviation (2006–2007) (Peoples Democratic Party)
Ayelet Shaked, Israeli Minister of Justice (2015–2019)

Members of national and supranational parliaments

Current
Per-Willy Amundsen, Minister of Justice of Norway (2016–2018) and member of the Norwegian Parliament (2005–2013, 2017–present) (Progress Party)
Gerolf Annemans, Belgian Member of the European Parliament (2014–present) (Vlaams Belang)
Jordan Bardella, French Member of the European Parliament (2019–present) (National Rally)
Thierry Baudet, member of the Dutch House of Representatives (Forum for Democracy)
Conrad Black, member of the UK House of Lords (2002–present) (on leave of absence) and media mogul
Eduardo Bolsonaro, member of the Brazilian Chamber of Deputies (2015–present), Chamber Leader for the Social Liberal Party (2019–2020) and son of President Jair Bolsonaro
María Fernanda Cabal, member of the Senate of Colombia (2018–present)
Kristian Thulesen Dahl, member of the Danish Folketing (1994–present) (Danish People's Party)
Giovanni Donzelli, member of the Italian Chamber of Deputies (2018–present) (Brothers of Italy)
Nicolas Dupont-Aignan, member of the French National Assembly for Essonne's 8th constituency (1997–present) and President of Debout la France (2008–present)
Vojtěch Filip, member of the Chamber of Deputies of the Czech Republic (1996–present) (Communist Party of Bohemia and Moravia)
Tom Van Grieken, member of the Belgian Chamber of Representatives (2019–present) (Vlaams Belang)
Armin-Paul Hampel, member of the German Bundestag (2017–present) (Alternative for Germany)
Hermann Tertsch, Member of the European Parliament (2019–present) (Vox)
Iván Espinosa de los Monteros, Spokesperson of the Vox Parliamentary Group in the Spanish Congress of Deputies (2019–present) (Vox)
Paul Girvan, Member of Parliament for South Antrim in the House of Commons of the United Kingdom (2017–present) (Democratic Unionist Party)
Catherine Griset, French Member of the European Parliament (2019–present) (National Rally)
Damir Kajin, member of the Croatian Sabor (1992–present) (Istrian Democrats)
Ulf Leirstein, member of the Norwegian Storting (2005–present) (Independent)
Marine Le Pen, member of the French National Assembly for Pas-de-Calais's 11th constituency (2017–present) and President of National Rally (2011–present)
Carlos Felipe Mejía, member of the Senate of Colombia (2014–present)
Kenneth Meshoe, member of the National Assembly of South Africa (1994–present) and Leader of the African Christian Democratic Party (1993–present)
Stefano Mugnai, member of the Italian Chamber of Deputies (2018–present) (Forza Italia)
Mika Niikko, member of the Parliament of Finland for Uusimaa (2011–present) (Finns Party)
Tomio Okamura, member of the Chamber of Deputies of the Czech Republic (2013–present) (Freedom and Direct Democracy)
Peter Osuský, member of the Slovak National Council (2010–present) (Freedom and Solidarity)
Ian Paisley Jr, Member of Parliament for North Antrim in the House of Commons of the United Kingdom (2010–present), and son of former First Minister of Northern Ireland Ian Paisley (Democratic Unionist Party)
Antonio Palmieri, member of the Italian Chamber of Deputies (2018–present) (Forza Italia)
Don Plett, Leader of the Opposition in the Senate of Canada (2019–present) (Conservative)
Stéphane Ravier, member of the French Senate for Bouches-du-Rhône (2014–present) (National Rally)
Jérôme Rivière, French Member of the European Parliament (2019–present) (National Rally)
Jan Skopeček, member of the Chamber of Deputies of the Czech Republic (2017–present) (Civic Democratic Party)
Achille Totaro, member of the Italian Senate (2018–present) (Brothers of Italy)
Tsai Yi-Yu, member of the Legislative Yuan (2016–present) (Democratic Progressive Party)
Juan David Vélez, member of the Chamber of Representatives of Colombia (2014–present)
Sammy Wilson, Member of Parliament for East Antrim in the House of Commons of the United Kingdom (2005–present) (Democratic Unionist Party)
Pierantonio Zanettin, member of the Italian Chamber of Deputies (2018–present) (previously endorsed Michael Bloomberg, Forza Italia)

Former 
Lynn Beyak, member of the Senate of Canada from Ontario (2013–2021)
Haim Drukman, member of the Israeli Knesset (1977–1988, 1999–2003) (National Religious Party)
Nigel Farage, British right-wing populist politician, leader of the Brexit Party, former leader of UKIP and former Member of the European Parliament (Brexit Party since 2019)
Paolo Guzzanti, member of the Italian Chamber of Deputies (2008–2013), member of the Italian Senate from Latium (2006–2008) and Lombardy (1994–2006)
Carl I. Hagen, Vice President of the Norwegian Storting (2005–2009), member of the Storting for Oslo (1974–1977) and leader of the Progress Party (1978–2006)
Hillel Horowitz, member of the Israeli Knesset (2013–2015) (The Jewish Home)
José Antonio Kast, member of the Chamber of Deputies of Chile from District 30 (2002–2014) and District 24 (2014–2018) (Republican Party)
Milan Krajniak, member of the Slovak National Council (2016–2020) (We Are Family)
František Mikloško, member of the Slovak National Council (1990–2010) (Conservative Democrats of Slovakia)
Vladimír Palko, member of the Slovak National Council (1998–2002, 2006–2010) (Conservative Democrats of Slovakia)
Ciro Roza, member of the Legislative Assembly of Santa Catarina (2011–2015) (Social Democratic Party)

Local officials

Current 

Yossi Dagan, Israeli politician, Chair of the Shomron Regional Council (2015–present) (Likud)
Mike Sonko, Governor of Nairobi (2017–present) and member of the Kenyan National Assembly (2010–2013) (Jubilee Party)
László Toroczkai, Mayor of Ásotthalom (2013–present) and President of Our Homeland Movement

Former 

Dragan Marković, Mayor of Jagodina (2004–2012) and leader of United Serbia

Party officials

Current 

 Billy Te Kahika, leader of the New Zealand Public Party (2020–present)

Party officials

Current

James Ada, Chair of the Northern Mariana Islands Republican Party (2014–present)
Rich Anderson, Chair of the Virginia Republican Party (2020–present) and member of the Virginia House of Delegates from District 51 (2011–2018)
Robin Armstrong, National Committeeman of the Republican National Committee in Texas (2012–present) and physician
David Bossie, National Committeeman of the Republican National Committee in Maryland (2016–present), president of Citizens United and former deputy campaign manager to the Donald Trump presidential campaign
M. Jane Brady, Chair of the Delaware Republican Party (2019–present) and Attorney General of Delaware (1995–2005)
Jennifer Carnahan, Chair of the Minnesota Republican Party (2017–present)
Andrea Catsimatidis, Chair of the Manhattan Republican Party (2017–present) and socialite
Jim Christiana, Chair of the Republican Committee of Beaver County (2019–present)
Laura Cox, Chair of the Michigan Republican Party (2019–present) and member of the Michigan House of Representatives from District 19 (2015–2019)
Harmeet Dhillon, National Committeewoman of the Republican National Committee for California (2016–present) and lawyer
Joe Gruters, Chair of the Florida Republican Party (2019–present), member of the Florida Senate from District 23 (2018–present), and member of the Florida House of Representatives from District 73 (2016–2018)
Marti Halverson, National Committeewoman of the Republican National Committee in Wyoming (2012–present)
Thomas Hicks Jr., Co-chair of the Republican National Committee (2019–present)
Robert J. Kabel, National Committeeman of the Republican National Committee in the District of Columbia (2016–present) and chair of the Log Cabin Republicans
Jeff Kaufmann, Chair of the Iowa Republican Party (2014–present) and member of the Iowa House of Representatives from District 79 (2005–2013)
Kimberly Klacik, member of the Baltimore County Republican Central Committee (2018–present) and 2020 Republican nominee for the U.S. House for Maryland's 7th district
Lori Klein Corbin, National Committeewoman of the Republican National Committee in Arizona (2016–present) and member of the Arizona Senate from Arizona's 6th District (2011–2013)
Debra Lamm, National Committeewoman of the Republican National Committee in Montana (2020–present), Chair of the Montana Republican Party (2017–2019) and member of the Montana House of Representatives from District 60 (2015–2017)
Nick Langworthy, Chair of the New York Republican Party (2019–present) and Chair of the Erie County Republican Party (2010–2019)
Terry Lathan, Chair of the Alabama Republican Party (2015–present)
Dan Lederman, Chair of the South Dakota Republican Party (2017–present), member of the South Dakota Senate from District 16 (2011–2015) and member of the South Dakota House of Representatives from District 16 (2009–2011)
Leora Levy, National Committeewoman of the Republican National Committee in Connecticut (2016–present)
James Lyons Jr, Chair of the Massachusetts Republican Party (2019–present) and member of the Massachusetts House of Representatives from Essex District 18 (2011–2019)
Meshawn Maddock, Chair of the 11th Congressional District Republican Committee (2019–present)
Ronna McDaniel, Co-chair of Republican National Committee (2017–present) and Chair of the Michigan Republican Party (2015–2017)
David McLain, Chair of the Oklahoma Republican Party (2019–present)
Steve Pearce, Chair of the New Mexico Republican Party (2018–present) and U.S. Representative from NM-02 (2011–2019)
Pam Pollard, National Committeewoman of the Republican National Committee in Oklahoma (2020–present) and Chair of the Oklahoma Republican Party (2015–2019)
Todd Ricketts, Finance Chair of the Republican National Committee (2019–present) and co-owner of the Chicago Cubs
Tim Schneider, Chair of the Illinois Republican Party (2014–present)
David Shafer, Chair of the Georgia Republican Party (2019–present), president pro tempore of the Georgia Senate (2013–2019) and member of the Georgia Senate from District 48 (2002–2019)
Shawn Steel, National Committeeman of the Republican National Committee in California (2008–present)
Stephen Stepanek, Chair of the New Hampshire Republican Party (2019–present)
Joshua Tardy, National Committeeman of the Republican National Committee in Maine (2019–present), Minority Leader of the Maine House of Representatives (2006–2010) and member of the Maine House of Representatives from District 25 (2004–2010) and District 125 (2002–2004)
Jane Timken, Chair of the Ohio Republican Party (2017–present)
Christine Toretti, National Committeewoman of the Republican National Committee in Pennsylvania (1997–present), businesswoman and philanthropist
Alex Triantafilou, Chair of the Hamilton County Republican Party (2008–present)
Kelli Ward, Chair of the Arizona Republican Party (2019–present) and member of the Arizona Senate from District 5 (2013–2015)
Allen West, Chair of the Texas Republican Party (2020–present) and U.S. Representative from FL-22 (2011–2013)
Art Wittich, National Committeeman of the Republican in Montana (2016–present)
Solomon Yue, National Committeeman of the Republican in Oregon (2000–present)

Former
Robert R. Asher, National Committeeman of the Republican National Committee in Pennsylvania (1998–2020) and Chair of the Pennsylvania Republican Party (1983–1986)
David Barton, Vice Chair of the Texas Republican Party (1997–2006)
James Bopp Jr, National Committeeman of the Republican National Committee in Indiana (2006–2012) and Vice Chairman of the Republican National Committee (2008–2012)
Eli Bremer, Chair of the El Paso County Republican Party (2011–2013)
Elliott Broidy, Finance Chair of the Republican National Committee (2005–2008) and convicted felon
Chad Connelly, Chair of the South Carolina Republican Party (2011–2013)
Brad Courtney, Chair of the Wisconsin Republican Party (2011–2019)
Edward F. Cox, Chair of the New York Republican Party (2009–2019)
Katon Dawson, Chair of the South Carolina Republican Party (2002–2009)
James Dickey, Chair of the Texas Republican Party (2017–2020)
Ada Fisher, National Committeewoman of the Republican National Committee in North Carolina (2008–2020)
Robert Graham, Chair of the Arizona Republican Party (2013–2017)
Bill Harris, Chair of the Alabama Republican Party (1977–1985)
Jonathan Lines, Chair of the Arizona Republican Party (2018–2019)
Ed Martin, Chair of the Missouri Republican Party (2013–2015)
Bob Paduchik, Co-chair of the Republican National Committee (2017–2019)
Jo Rae Perkins, Chair of the Linn County Republican Party (2009–2012) 
Ralph Reed, Chair of the Georgia Republican Party (2001–2003)
Bobby Schostak, Chair of the Michigan Republican Party (2011–2015)
Doug Steinhardt, Chair of the New Jersey Republican Party (2017–2021)
Allen Weh, Chair of the New Mexico Republican Party (2004–2009)
Thomas Wright, Chair of the Utah Republican Party (2011–2013)
Steve Wynn, Finance Chair of the Republican National Committee (2017–2018) real estate businessman and art collector

Organizations

State and territorial political parties
Alabama Republican Party
Alaska Republican Party
Arizona Republican Party
Arkansas Republican Party
California Republican Party
Colorado Republican Party
Conservative Party of New York State
Connecticut Republican Party
Delaware Republican Party
Florida Republican Party
Georgia Republican Party
Guam Republican Party
Hawaii Republican Party
Idaho Republican Party
Illinois Republican Party
Indiana Republican Party
Iowa Republican Party
Kansas Republican Party
Kentucky Republican Party
Louisiana Republican Party
Maine Republican Party
Maryland Republican Party
Massachusetts Republican Party
Michigan Republican Party
Minnesota Republican Party
Mississippi Republican Party
Missouri Republican Party
Montana Republican Party
Nebraska Republican Party
Nevada Republican Party
New Hampshire Republican Party
New Jersey Republican Party
New Mexico Republican Party
New York Republican Party
New York State Right to Life Party
North Carolina Republican Party
North Dakota Republican Party
Northern Mariana Islands Republican Party
Ohio Republican Party
Oklahoma Republican Party
Oregon Republican Party
Pennsylvania Republican Party
Rhode Island Republican Party
South Carolina Republican Party
South Dakota Republican Party
Tennessee Republican Party
Texas Republican Party
Utah Republican Party
Virgin Islands Republican Party
Virginia Republican Party
West Virginia Republican Party
Wisconsin Republican Party
Wyoming Republican Party

Local political parties
Cook County Republican Party
Palos Township Republican Organization
Republican Party of Eau Claire County
Shelby County Republican Party (Alabama)
Shelby County Republican Party (Tennessee)
Travis County Republican Party

International political parties

Conservative People's Party of Estonia
Miroslav Škoro Homeland Movement
Taiwan Solidarity Union
Taliban (endorsement rejected by Trump)
United Serbia
Vox

See also
List of Republicans who opposed the Donald Trump 2020 presidential campaign
Endorsements in the 2020 Republican Party presidential primaries
List of Donald Trump 2016 presidential campaign endorsements
List of former Trump administration officials who endorsed Joe Biden
List of Joe Biden 2020 presidential campaign endorsements
List of Jo Jorgensen 2020 presidential campaign endorsements
List of Howie Hawkins 2020 presidential campaign endorsements
News media endorsements in the 2020 United States presidential primaries

References 

Trump, Donald, political
Trump 2020, Donald, political
endorsements, political, list
2020 presidential campaign endorsements, political